M-Market is a Finnish grocery store chain. The chain was founded by independent retailers in 2006, which was created as a result of cooperation between retailers who opposed the sale of Spar Finland to SOK and resigned from the chain.

The M-chain's grocery sales (incl. consumer goods) were approximately EUR 98 million in 2015, when the chain's market share of the Finnish grocery trade was estimated at a total of 0.6%. The M-chain's stores are approximately 200–2,500 m2 in size.

The first M-Market stores opened their doors at the beginning of 2006, when 16 stores joined the chain. At the beginning of 2007, the chain already had 50 stores. When the Siwa chain's stores were sold in 2017, 14 new stores were added to the M chain. Today, the chain has about 60 stores.

References

External links

 M-Ketju – Official Site 

Cooperatives in Finland
Supermarkets of Finland
Retail companies of Finland